Griswell may refer to:

Griswell's Station, also known as Griswell's, a stagecoach station in Arizona
J. Barry Griswell, American businessman